Henry Holden Huss (June 21, 1862 in Newark, New Jersey – September 17, 1953 in New York City) was an American composer, pianist and music teacher.  Huss grew up in New York City, the son of German immigrant parents. After studying piano and organ locally with a teacher who had trained at the Leipzig Conservatory, Huss traveled to Munich to study at the Royal Conservatory with Josef Rheinberger.  His fellow students at the Royal Music School in Munich included Arthur Whiting and Horatio Parker.  After graduating, he returned to the States and embarked on a career as a touring piano virtuoso. As a composer, he was regarded as one of the best of his generation by those who counted, but unfortunately, it was at a time when American composers could rarely get a hearing for their works.

An exhaustive study of Huss' life and music, with a complete catalog of compositions, has been published: Henry Holden Huss: An American Composer's Life, by Gary A. Greene (1995, Scarecrow Press (Metuchen NJ and London)), .

Works
His 1886 Piano Trio in D minor, Op. 23, subtitled "The Munich" and dedicated to Rheinberger, was premiered with considerable acclaim and a number of other performances followed. However, the work remained unpublished until 2008 when Edition Silvertrust brought out the world premiere edition. It was edited by Skyler Silvertrust and The Rawlins Piano Trio, who in 2004 made the world premiere recording of it. Huss' String Quartet, Op. 31, dedicated to Mrs. Frederick Coolidge, was published in 1921 by G. Schirmer Inc., New York, for the Society for the Publication of American Music (S.P.A.M.). Huss was a founder of the American Guild of Organists.

The British label Hyperion released a recording of his Piano Concerto in B major, Op. 10, as part of their Romantic Piano Concertos series.

References

External links
Henry Holden Huss manuscripts in the Music Division of The New York Public Library for the Performing Arts
Henry Holden Huss Piano Trio--Sound-bites and discussion of the work
 

1862 births
1953 deaths
19th-century classical composers
20th-century classical composers
American male classical composers
American classical pianists
Male classical pianists
American male pianists
American people of German descent
Musicians from Newark, New Jersey
Pupils of Josef Rheinberger
American Romantic composers
19th-century American composers
20th-century American composers
Classical musicians from New York (state)
Classical musicians from New Jersey
20th-century American male musicians
19th-century American male musicians